Félix Regnault (17 June 1863 in Rennes – 4 October 1938) was a French physician, anthropologist and prehistorian.
He served as president of the Société d'Anthropologie de Paris and the Société préhistorique française (1928).

Works
Partial list

Regnault, F. (1895). Les artistes préhistoriques d’après les dernières découvertes. La Nature 1167(12 octobre 1895): 305–307.
Regnault, F. (1897). Hypnotisme, religion. Preface by Camille Saint-Saëns. 
Regnault, F. (1900). Les Lépreux au Moyen-Age. in Correspondant Médical: Journal Médical, Scientifique Littéraire et Illustré 6(130):5.
Regnault, F. (1907). Les Figurines Antiques Devant l'Art et la Médecine. Médecin (Paris, France) 4:26ff. 
Regnault, F. (1912). Les représentations de l'obésite dans l'art préhistorique. Bulletin de la Société d'Anthropologie de Paris, Series 6, 3:35-39. 
Regnault, F. (1924). Les representations de femmes dans l'art paléolithique sont stéatomères, non stéatopyges. Bulletin de la Société Préhistorique Francaise 21:84-88.

His collection of prehistoric artefacts is held by the Muséum de Toulouse.

References
 Desoille, H. (1938) Félix Regnault, notice nécrologique Bulletins et Mémoires de la Société d'anthropologie de Paris, VIII° Série, t. 9, fasc. 4-6, p. 120.

External links

Félix Regnault sur le site du CTHS

Prehistorians
19th-century French physicians
French anthropologists
Scientists from Rennes
1863 births
1938 deaths
20th-century French physicians
Physicians from Rennes